Beautiful Broken is the sixteenth studio album by American rock band Heart, released on July 8, 2016, by Concord Records. Aside from two new songs, the album consists mostly of re-interpretations of songs from the band's earlier albums.

Track listing

Personnel
Credits adapted from the liner notes of Beautiful Broken.

Heart
 Ann Wilson – vocals ; background vocals ; autoharp 
 Nancy Wilson – guitar ; background vocals ; vocals ; marxophone ; bowed acoustic guitar ; acoustic guitar ; autoharp, handclaps, whispers 
 Ben Smith – drums ; percussion ; claps, snaps 
 Craig Bartock – guitars ; acoustic guitar ; 12-string acoustic guitar ; background vocals ; percussive guitar, claps, snaps 
 Chris Joyner – synthesizers ; piano ; Wurlitzer ; Hammond B3 ; field organ, nylon-string guitar 
 Dan Rothchild – bass ; background vocals ; additional synthesizer ; Moog bass ; Hammond B3, additional piano ; background vocals ; guitar ; acoustic guitar ; lap steel guitar ; percussion ; textures ; upright bass ; additional guitar ; handclaps

Additional musicians
 James Hetfield – vocals, background vocals 
 Paul Buckmaster – string arrangement 
 Hungarian Studio Orchestra – strings 
 Péter Illényi – conducting
 Péter Kanyurszky – concertmaster
 Ken Sluiter – additional textures ; claps, snaps ; textures 
 Billy Mims – claps, snaps 
 Dwight Mikkelsen – copyist

Technical
 Dan Rothchild – production
 Nancy Wilson – production
 Ken Sluiter – engineering, mixing
 Bill Mims – additional engineering
 Howie Weinberg – mastering
 Gentry Studer – mastering assistance
 Chris Claypool – engineering assistance
 Geoff Neal – engineering assistance
 Greg Fidelman – additional engineering (James Hetfield's vocals)
 Kurina Tamás – strings recording

Artwork
 Brian McGuffey – artwork
 Nancy Wilson – art direction
 Anna Knowlden – photography
 Dan Rothchild – photography

Charts

Notes

References

2016 albums
Concord Records albums
Heart (band) albums